"Elvis has left the building" is a phrase that was often used by public address announcers at the conclusion of Elvis Presley concerts in order to disperse audiences who lingered in hopes of an encore. It has since become a catchphrase and punchline.

Origin
The phrase was first used by promoter Horace Logan at the Hirsch Memorial Coliseum on the fairgrounds of the Louisiana State Fair in Shreveport, Louisiana, on December 15, 1956. Presley had appeared in the middle of the night's lineup, and Logan needed to quiet the audience so that the remaining performers could play. The full quotation was:

"Elvis has left the building" is also heard at the end of Presley's March 1961 Pearl Harbor Memorial benefit concert, after he exits at the end of "Hound Dog" and a short coda from the band.

Throughout the 1970s, the phrase was captured on record several times, spoken by Al Dvorin. In later years the phrase would be spoken by some of Presley's backup singers to calm down the audience after concerts.

In popular culture
The phrase has since become a catchphrase and punchline, used to refer to anyone who has exited in some sense (even death). For instance, it might be used when someone makes a dramatic exit from an argument, to relieve tension among those who remain. Baseball broadcasters on radio or television sometimes use the phrase as a humorous way to describe a home run, which is typically hit over the outfield fence, leaving the field of play. Other examples or variants include:
Former Pittsburgh Penguins hockey hall-of-fame broadcaster Mike Lange used the phrase after Penguins home game wins.
In the early part of his original heel run, WWE wrestler Shawn Michaels's departure from the arena during live events would be announced as "The Heartbreak Kid Shawn Michaels has left the building."
"Elvis Has Just Left the Building" is a song by Frank Zappa, first released in 1988 on Broadway the Hard Way.
Legendary Australian Football League commentator Dennis Cometti, on a skirmish between Essendon and Hawthorn great Paul Salmon and the more slimline St Kilda star Nicky "Elvis" Winmar: "Just as Winmar landed, big Salmon came crashing down on top of him. They're slowly getting up, and now I can report the building has left the Elvis."
 A bonus with this name in the video game GTA 2, where the player must kill Presley look-alikes moving through the streets in a single line  in less than 5 seconds to get it (the phrase is then spoken, as well as visible on the screen).

See also
Cultural impact of Elvis Presley
That's all there is, there isn't any more

References

Elvis Presley
English phrases
1950s neologisms
Quotations from music
Catchphrases